Colette Wong (born 21 May 1974) is a Singaporean sports reporter, TV host, and sports anchor for Fox Sports Asia and Fox Sports News Asia. She was formerly currently anchors Fox Sports Central Asia and a news correspondent for CNBC Asia.

Life and career
Colette Wong was born in Singapore on 21 May 1974. Colette graduated from Catholic Junior College in 1992 and University College Dublin, where she finished Bachelor of Arts (Hons), Politics and Economics in 1996.

Colette got her first job in December 1996, as a sports reporter, producer and presenter for Television Corporation of Singapore's Singapore Television Twelve, from 1996 to 2000. Colette later became the news correspondent for CNBC Asia from 2001 to 2003.

ESPN Star Sports later hired Colette in March 2004, as the anchorwoman for SportsCenter Asia with Jason Dasey, then she became the host of Nokia Football Crazy from 2005 to 2008. Colette later became one of the lead anchors of Fox Sports Central Asia when ESPN became Fox Sports Asia in 2013. She was the winner of the ‘Best Sports Presenter/Commentator’ award at the 21st Asian TV Awards in 2016  and 'highly commended' in the 'Best sports presenter/commentator' section of the 18th Asian Television Awards 2013.

Personal life 

Colette is married to sales manager Luigi Ferrandi. They have two children.

Filmography
 SportsCenter Asia (2004–2013) ESPN Asia
 Nokia Football Crazy (2005–2008) ESPN Asia 
 Fox Sports Central Asia (2013–2021) Fox Sports Asia

See also
 Fox Sports Asia

References

External links

1974 births
Living people
Alumni of University College Dublin
Singaporean television journalists
Singaporean women journalists
Singaporean television personalities
Singaporean women television presenters
Catholic Junior College alumni